General elections were held in the Dominican Republic on 16 May 1957. Héctor Trujillo was the only candidate in the presidential election, and was elected unopposed, although his predecessor and brother Rafael Trujillo maintained absolute control of the country. The Dominican Party won every seat in the Congressional elections.

Results

References

Dominican Republic
1957 in the Dominican Republic
Elections in the Dominican Republic
One-party elections
Single-candidate elections
Presidential elections in the Dominican Republic
Election and referendum articles with incomplete results
May 1957 events in North America